The  2011–12 Hereford United season was the club's 91st season, 3rd consecutive year in League Two and 31st overall in the Football League. The season covers the period from 1st June 2011 to 31st May 2012.

Season summary 

Hereford began the league season with just one win in their first twelve matches, including heavy home defeats to Morecambe, Macclesfield Town, and Gillingham. In the League Cup, a 1–0 victory over League One side Brentford in the first round earned a visit to Premier League outfit Aston Villa; the Bulls resisted 80 minutes of pressure before succumbing to a 2–0 defeat. Stuart Fleetwood, Hereford's top goalscorer in the 2010–11 season, was sold to Conference side Luton Town on 1st September 2011.

Three consecutive victories in October, which featured veteran defender Andy Todd in his short spell with the Bulls, proved to be Hereford's best run of form in an otherwise lacklustre campaign. Blackpool loanee Tom Barkhuizen was the Bulls' top goalscorer, having extended his loan spell at Edgar Street from its initial planned finish in January through to the end of the campaign.

Despite a 3–2 home victory over Torquay United in the final game of the season, results elsewhere confirmed Hereford's 23rd-placed finish and relegation to the  Conference on 5th May 2012. The Whites would not return to the Football League before the club's liquidation in December 2014.

League table

Squad statistics

Appearances and goals

|-
|colspan="14"|Players who played for Hereford this season who have since left the club:

|}

Top scorers

Disciplinary record

Results

Pre-season friendlies

League Two

FA Cup

League Cup

FL Trophy

Transfers

Awards

References 

2011-12
2011–12 Football League Two by team